Rainbow Falls is a waterfall on Rainbow Creek in the U.S. state of Washington. The waterfall is located inside the Lake Chelan National Recreation Area in the North Cascades National Park, and is near Stehekin.  The falls drops  in two tiers. The uppermost tier falls  to a basin.

The waterfall is accessible from a series of trails maintained by the National Park Service and is easily visible from the Stehekin Valley Road.  During the summer months a National Park Service shuttle provides regular transport from the Stehekin dock to Rainbow Falls.

References

Waterfalls of Washington (state)
Landforms of Chelan County, Washington